The Game Boy Advance (GBA) is a 2001 handheld video game system developed by Nintendo.

GBA may also refer to:

Science and technology
Generalized Büchi automaton, in automata theory, a variant of Büchi automaton
Generic Bootstrapping Architecture, a cryptographic technology that enables the authentication of a user
Glucocerebrosidase, a human enzyme
GBA2, a gene which encodes for cytosolic beta-glucosidase
GBA3, a gene which encodes for cytosolic beta-glucosidase
Gut–brain axis, biochemical signaling between the gastrointestinal tract and the central nervous system

Organizations
Gemeinsamer Bundesausschuss (Federal Joint Committee, G-BA), a public health decision-making body in Germany
Geologische Bundesanstalt, the geological survey of Austria
 (GBA)
Ghana Bar Association, a professional association in Ghana
Giving Back to Africa, a Bloomington, Indiana non-profit organization 
Global Banking Alliance for Women, a non-profit organization concentrating on women's wealth 
 Golaghat Bar Association, a voluntary bar association in India
 Governing Bodies Association, an organisation of governing bodies of independent schools in the UK
Gute Bücher für Alle, a German charity which operates floating bookshops.
Public Prosecutor General (Germany) (Generalbundesanwalt, GBA)

Companies
Cahaba Government Benefit Administrators, subsidiary of Blue Cross and Blue Shield of Alabama
Gramin Bank of Aryavart, a Regional Rural Bank in Uttar Pradesh, India
Greater Bay Airlines, a low-cost carrier based in Hong Kong, China
Greenbrier Academy for Girls, a therapeutic college preparatory boarding school in Pence Springs, West Virginia
Groen Brothers Aviation, now Skyworks Global, an American autogyro research and development company
KGBA (AM), a radio station (1490 AM) in Calexico, California, United States
KGBA-FM, a radio station (100.1 FM) in Holtville, California, United States
WGBA-TV, a television station in Green Bay, Wisconsin

People
G. B. A. Coker, a former Judge of the Nigerian Supreme Court

Geography
GBA, international vehicle country code for Alderney ('Great Britain: Alderney')
Greater Buenos Aires, the urban agglomeration comprising the autonomous city of Buenos Aires and the adjacent 24 partidos
GBA, IATA airport code for Cotswold Airport in the United Kingdom
Guangdong-Hong Kong-Macau Greater Bay Area, often simply referred to as the Greater Bay Area

Music
"G.B.A.", a song on Solace (Xavier Rudd album)
God Bless America, American patriotic song written by Irving Berlin

Sports
Geelong Baseball Association, an Australian baseball association and league
Global Basketball Association, minor league in the United States in the early 1990s
Guam Basketball Association, Guam's professional basketball league

Process
Gender-based Analysis, a management process to explore the changing realities and inequalities based on gender

Other uses
Game Boy Advance SP, a redesign of the Game Boy Advance, released in 2003